The Mfuwe man-eating lion was one of the largest man-eating lions on record, perhaps the largest, at over  in length and  in mass. It was killed in 1991 in the Luangwa River valley, Zambia, by an American, Wayne Hosek. It had eaten six humans around Mfuwe, the valley's main settlement. The cat's body has been on display at the Field Museum in Chicago since 1998, its specimen joining a notorious pair of man-eating lions dubbed the Tsavo lions.

References

Sources

 
 
 Sci Rep 7, 904

External links
Lion of Mfuwe at Field Museum
The Man-Eater of Mfuwe, Tetrapod Zoology, Scientific American blog network, 2012

1991 animal deaths
Collection of the Field Museum of Natural History
Deaths due to lion attacks
Individual lions
History of Zambia
Man-eaters
Individual wild animals